Frederick or Fred Gamble may refer to:
 Frederick Gamble (cricketer) (1905–1965), English cricketer and footballer
 Frederick William Gamble, British zoologist and author
 Fred Gamble (actor) (1868–1939), American film actor
 Fred Gamble (racing driver) (born 1932), American former racing driver